The Domeyko Fault or Precordilleran Fault System is a geological fault located in  Northern Chile. The fault is of the  strike-slip type and runs parallel to the Andes, the coast and the nearby Atacama Fault. The fault originated in the Eocene. Along its length the Domeyko Fault hosts several porphyry copper deposits including Chuquicamata, Collahuasi, El Abra, El Salvador, La Escondida and Potrerillos. The fault is named after 19th century geologist Ignacy Domeyko.

See also
Chilean Iron Belt
Copperbelt
El Indio Gold Belt

References

Geology of Antofagasta Region
Geology of Atacama Region
Seismic faults of Chile
Strike-slip faults